Hurdegaryp (called Hardegarijp until 1999) is a railway station located in Hurdegaryp, Netherlands. The station was opened on 1 June 1866 and is located on the Harlingen–Nieuweschans railway between Leeuwarden and Groningen. The train service is operated by Arriva.

Until 30 May 1999 the station was called Hardegarijp, the Dutch name for the village.

Train services

Bus services

External links
Arriva website
Public Transport journey planner

See also
 List of railway stations in Friesland

Railway stations in Friesland
Railway stations opened in 1866
Railway stations on the Staatslijn B
1866 establishments in the Netherlands
Railway stations in the Netherlands opened in the 19th century